The 1969 Louisiana Tech Bulldogs football team was an American football team that represented the Louisiana Polytechnic Institute (now Louisiana Tech University) as a member of the Gulf States Conference (GSC) during the 1969 NCAA College Division football season. In their third year under head coach Maxie Lambright, the team compiled an 8–2 record, were GSC champions, and lost to East Tennessee State in the Grantland Rice Bowl.

Schedule

References

Louisiana Tech
Louisiana Tech Bulldogs football seasons
Louisiana Tech Bulldogs football